The Sunderland Loyal Volunteers was a volunteer corps associated  with the City (then a town) of Sunderland in North East England.  In existence between 1794 and 1802 and again from 1803 to 1812, it manned batteries at the mouth of the River Wear during the Napoleonic Wars.

References

Units of the British Volunteer Corps
Military units and formations in County Durham
Military units and formations in Sunderland
Military units and formations established in 1794
Military units and formations disestablished in 1812